McAullay is a surname. Notable people with the surname include:

Ken McAullay (born 1949), Australian cricketer and Australian rules footballer
Simone McAullay (born 1976), Australian actress

See also
Macaulay (surname)